The 2014–15 NEC men's basketball season began with practices in October 2014, followed by the start of the 2014–15 NCAA Division I men's basketball season in November. Conference play started in early January 2015 and concluded in March with the 2015 Northeast Conference men's basketball tournament.

Preseason

Rankings

() first place votes

All-NEC team

Head coaches

Notes: 
 All records, appearances, titles, etc. are from time with current school only. 
 Year at school includes 2014–15 season.
 Overall and NEC/NCAA records are from time at current school and are before the beginning of the 2014–15 season.
 Previous jobs are head coaching jobs unless otherwise noted.

NEC regular season

Conference matrix
This table summarizes the head-to-head results between teams in conference play. (x) indicates games remaining this season.

Player of the week
Throughout the regular season, the Northeast Conference offices named a player of the week and a freshman of the week each Monday. Jalen Cannon garnered 5 player of the week honors and St. Francis Brooklyn all programs with 6. Marcquise Reed led all freshman with 6 player of the week honors, Cane Broom came in second with 5 and in week 4 won both Player of the Week and Rookie of the Week.

Postseason

NEC tournament

  March 4–10, 2015 Northeast Conference Basketball Tournament.

All games will be played at the venue of the higher seed* Overtime

NCAA tournament

National Invitational tournament

CollegeInsider.com Postseason tournament

Honors and awards

All-Americans

Starting on March 6, the 2015 NCAA Men's Basketball All-Americans were released for 2014–15 season, based upon selections by the four major syndicates. The four syndicates include the Associated Press, USBWA, NABC, and Sporting News.

Jalen Cannon SFBK, AP Honorable Mention

All-NEC awards and teams

Milestones and records
On January 4, 2015, head coach Andrew Toole of Robert Morris  became the quickest to 100 wins in NEC history, needing just 160 games to get there.
On February 7, 2015, senior forward Jalen Cannon of the St. Francis Brooklyn Terriers became the all-time rebounds leader in Northeast Conference history.

See also
2014–15 Northeast Conference women's basketball season

References

External links
NEC website